Tristaniopsis collina, known as hill water gum or hill kanuka, is a tree of eastern Australia.

The natural range of T. collina is from near Mount Gulaga (36° S) in the south of New South Wales to the border with the state of Queensland at the McPherson Range (28° S). The usual habitat is rainforest away from streams on shallow soils at high altitude. However, it can occasionally be seen at low altitudes such as at Seal Rocks and Chatswood West. T. collina is remarkably similar to the related T. laurina (Water Gum), but the latter species is strictly riparian.

Description 

The trunk is irregular, not cylindrical. The bark is grey or creamy, very thin, with papery fibres that come off to touch. Branchlets are coloured purple and angular in cross section. The midrib is sunken on the top surface, but raised below.

Yellow flowers form in cymes from November to January. The fruit is a dry capsule maturing from April to July. The fruit is practically identical to that of T. laurina.

References

  (Publication details included in citation)

collina
Myrtales of Australia
Trees of Australia
Flora of New South Wales
Flora of Queensland